Riva di Solto is a comune (municipality) in the Province of Bergamo in the Italian region of Lombardy, located about  northeast of Milan and about  east of Bergamo, on the western shore of the Lake Iseo.

Riva di Solto borders the following municipalities: Fonteno, Marone, Parzanica, Pisogne, Solto Collina.

Demographic evolution

References